Vilém or Vilem is Czech form of Germanic name William. It may refer to:

Vilém Blodek (1834–1874), Czech composer, flautist, and pianist
Vilém Dušan Lambl (1824–1895), Czech physician
Vilém Flusser (1920–1991), philosopher born in Czechoslovakia
Vilém Gajdušek (1895–1977), Czech optician and prominent telescope designer
Vilém Goppold, Jr. (born 1893, date of death unknown), a Bohemian Olympic fencer
Vilém Goppold von Lobsdorf (1869–1943), Bohemian fencer and olympic medalist in sabre competition
Vilém Heš (1860–1908), Czech operatic bass
Vilém Heckel (1918–1970), Czech photographer
Vilém Klíma (1906–1985), Czech electrical engineer
Vilém Kurz (1872–1945), Czech pianist, piano teacher, professor
Vilém Loos (1895–1942), Czechoslovak ice hockey player
Vilém Lugr (1911–1981), Czech footballer and football manager
Vilém Mandlík, Olympic 200 metre semi-finalist for Czechoslovakia in 1956
Vilém Mathesius (1882–1945), Czech linguist and literary historian
Vilém Petrželka (1889–1967), Czech composer and conductor
Vilém Prusinovský z Víckova (1534–1572), Olomouc Bishop
Vilem Slavata of Chlum (1572–1652), Czech nobleman from old Bohemian family
Vilem Sokol (born 1915), professor of music at the University of Washington
Vilém Tauský CBE (born 1910), Czech conductor and composer
Vilém Tvrzský (born 1880), Olympic fencer